The New England Legal Foundation (NELF) is a not-for-profit public interest foundation whose mission is promoting public discourse on the proper role of free enterprise in American society and advancing free enterprise principles in the courtroom.

NELF challenges intrusions by governments and special interest groups which would interfere with the economic freedoms of U.S. citizens and business enterprises in New England and the nation. Its ongoing mission is to champion individual economic liberties, traditional property rights, properly limited government, and balanced economic growth throughout the six state New England region.

NELF does not charge attorney's fees for its legal services. Its operating funds are provided through tax-deductible contributions made by individuals, businesses, law firms, and private charitable foundations who believe in NELF's mission.

Mission
The New England Legal Foundation is the only non-profit public interest law firm in the New England region addressing policy and constitutional concerns related to free enterprise. Its mission is promoting public discourse on the proper role of free enterprise in our society and advancing free enterprise principles in the courtroom. NELF's approach is non-partisan and is based on the premise that while the free market should not be left entirely unregulated, it usually provides the greatest opportunity for the greatest number when left free from unwarranted intrusion.

Cases
NELF handles precedent setting cases that involve business, financial and economic issues. The most common subject areas on its docket are government regulation, property rights, taxation and employment law. As a public interest law firm communicating with the courts, NELF does not attempt to change the law, but only aids the court in interpretation. NELF challenges unwarranted government intrusion on the free market by seeking redress in the courts.

NELF deals with cases that involve economic or commercial questions, and does not become involved in social issues. It selects cases based on their likelihood of creating precedent that will have policy and/or constitutional impact for the business community and society as a whole, therefore promoting the public good. NELF selects cases in which it can make policy, legislative history or empirical arguments which are not featured, or at least not emphasized, in the parties' briefs.

References

External links
 New England Legal Foundation's website

Organizations established in 1977
Non-profit organizations based in Boston
Libertarian organizations based in the United States
Legal advocacy organizations in the United States
501(c)(3) organizations